Said Salamat (also Romanized as Sa‘īd Salāmāt; also known as Sa‘īd, Salāmat-e Kūchak, Salāmat-e Kūchek, Salāmat-e Sa‘īd, and Salāmat-i-Kochek) is a village in Veys Rural District, Veys District, Bavi County, Khuzestan Province, Iran. At the 2006 census, its population was 285, in 49 families.

References 

Populated places in Bavi County